HD 83944 is a star system in the constellation Carina. This has the Bayer designation m Carinae, while HD 83944 is the identifier from the Henry Draper catalogue. It is a suspected variable with an apparent visual magnitude that fluctuates around 4.51 with an amplitude of 0.5. The system is located at a distance of approximately 226 light years from the Sun based on parallax, and it has an absolute magnitude of 0.31. It is a member of the Carina association of co-moving stars.

Although previously believed to be a single star, Chini et al. (2012) found this to be a double-lined spectroscopic binary. The stellar classification of B9IV/V matches a star that is entering the subgiant phase, although stellar models suggest it is still in the main sequence.

References 

B-type subgiants
Carina (constellation)
Carinae, m
Durchmusterung objects
083944
047391
3856
Suspected variables